The St Paul of the Cross Cathedral (Katedralen hram „Sveti Pavel ot Krasta“) is a Roman Catholic cathedral in the city of Rousse in northeastern Bulgaria. It is the cathedral church of the Nikopol diocese and it is dedicated to Saint Paul of the Cross, founder of the Passionists.

Built in 1890 to the designs of the Austria-Hungarian architect Valentino Dell'Antonio form Moena, the cathedral is an example of Gothic Revival architecture (and Brick Gothic in particular) in the country. The interior is decorated with sculptures and stained glass windows. It was the cathedral church of Blessed Eugene Bossilkov, bishop of Nicopoli, executed by the communists in 1952.

Organ 
The pipe organ of the cathedral was installed in 1907. It is the only one of its kind (with pneumatic action and with a Romantic sound) in Southeastern Europe, and was produced by the Voit company from Karlsruhe. It has two manuals and 13 stops. The instrument was damaged by the 1977 Bucharest earthquake and it was fully restored in 2004.

Disposition

Gallery

External links
 
 

Buildings and structures in Ruse, Bulgaria
Roman Catholic churches completed in 1890
19th-century Roman Catholic church buildings in Bulgaria
Gothic Revival church buildings in Bulgaria
Roman Catholic churches in Bulgaria
Tourist attractions in Ruse Province
Roman Catholic cathedrals in Bulgaria